Brendan Maclean is an Australian singer-songwriter and actor.

Music

Brendan Maclean's debut EP, White Canvas, was uploaded to iTunes March 2010. In January 2014 he released a second EP, Population, produced by Paul Mac. The lead single Stupid was featured by BuzzFeed and was heard as the Weather on Welcome to Night Vale, in episode 47, "Company Picnic." Soon after its release Maclean was signed to the Universal Music Publishing Group.

In May 2015 Brendan released his third EP on Bandcamp, Thought I'd Cry for You Forever. It features an original spoken-word piece from the author Neil Gaiman. In 2015 Maclean was nominated for an ARIA Award for his work with Marcia Hines on the Velvet Original Cast Soundtrack.

Maclean's first album funbang1 was released on 24 July 2016. It debuted at #2 on the Australian Independent Album Charts and peaked at #14 on iTunes. Three singles from the record were co-written with former Cobra Starship member Alex Suarez.

Their next record And The Boyfriends was released March, 2019 and entered Australian iTunes charts at #2 while reaching #9 on the Australian Independent Records charts.

House of Air
On 30 January 2017, Maclean uploaded the sexually explicit video for his single "House of Air" to YouTube. The video was later removed from YouTube for breaching its terms of service, but remains on Vimeo where it was made an Official Staff Pick. House of Air won a Berlin Music Video Award, gained entry to the Raindance Film Festival 2017 and SXSW as a part of the 2018 Midnight Shorts. Huffington Post and New York included House of Air in their Best Music Videos of 2017, the latter including a warning, "This video should not be viewed in any public setting."

Acting
Maclean appears as Ewing Klipspringer in the Baz Luhrmann adaptation of The Great Gatsby (2013).

In 2018 Brendan starred as Eli in the ABC Television comedy, 'Fucking Adelaide’ alongside Pamela Rabe, Kate Box and Tilda Cobham-Hervey

In 2022, Maclean played the title roles in the Australian premiere production of Jekyll & Hyde: The Musical. He received widely positive reviews for his performance, with The Sydney Morning Herald calling his depiction of Edward Hyde, “a revelation.”  The production won Best Musical Direction in the Sydney Theatre Awards 2022.

Radio
From 2007 to 2013, Maclean was a regular music presenter for Australian national youth station Triple J.

Discography

Singles
Stupid (2013)
Tectonic (2015)
House Of Air (2016)
Hibernia (2018)
Easy Love (2020)

EPs
White Canvas (2010)
Population (2014)
Thought I'd Cry for You Forever (2015)
solo [funbang1 B-Sides] (2017)

Albums
funbang1 (2016)
And The Boyfriends (2019)

Notable Recordings
Velvet, The Original Cast Album (2015)
Laura, Bat For Lashes cover with Amanda Palmer (2016)
Bright Light Bright Light feat. Brendan Maclean - Touchy (2020)
Prime Time, The Tubes cover with Tom Aspaul

References

External links

 Brendan Maclean's interview with Zan Rowe as "Murdoch"

1987 births
Living people
Male actors from Sydney
Australian gay musicians
Australian LGBT singers
Australian LGBT songwriters
Australian radio presenters
Australian LGBT broadcasters
Gay singers
Gay songwriters
21st-century Australian male singers
Australian male singer-songwriters
20th-century LGBT people
21st-century LGBT people
Musicians from Sydney